Eopolycotylus is an extinct genus of Polycotylid plesiosaur known from the Cenomanian-age Tropic Shale of Utah.

See also
 Timeline of plesiosaur research

 List of plesiosaurs

References

Fossil taxa described in 2007
Late Cretaceous plesiosaurs of North America
Polycotylids
Sauropterygian genera